An annular solar eclipse occurred on December 24, 1973. A solar eclipse occurs when the Moon passes between Earth and the Sun, thereby totally or partly obscuring the image of the Sun for a viewer on Earth. An annular solar eclipse occurs when the Moon's apparent diameter is smaller than the Sun's, blocking most of the Sun's light and causing the Sun to look like an annulus (ring). An annular eclipse appears as a partial eclipse over a region of the Earth thousands of kilometres wide. Annularity was visible from southern Mexico, southwestern Nicaragua, Costa Rica including the capital city San José, Panama, Colombia including the capital city Bogotá, southern Venezuela, Brazil, southern Guyana, southern Dutch Guiana (today's Suriname), southern French Guiana, Portuguese Cape Verde (today's Cape Verde) including the capital city Praia, Mauritania including the capital city Nouakchott, Spanish Sahara (today's Western Sahara), Mali, and Algeria.

The duration of annularity at maximum eclipse (closest to but slightly shorter than the longest duration) was 12 minutes, 2.37 seconds in the Atlantic Ocean near the Brazilian coast. It was the longest annular solar eclipse until January 14, 3080, but the Solar eclipse of December 14, 1955 lasted longer.

Related eclipses

Eclipses in 1973 
 An annular solar eclipse on Thursday, 4 January 1973.
 A penumbral lunar eclipse on Thursday, 18 January 1973.
 A penumbral lunar eclipse on Friday, 15 June 1973.
 A total solar eclipse on Saturday, 30 June 1973.
 A penumbral lunar eclipse on Sunday, 15 July 1973.
 A partial lunar eclipse on Monday, 10 December 1973.
 An annular solar eclipse on Monday, 24 December 1973.

Solar eclipses of 1971–1974

Saros 141

Metonic series

Notes

References

1973 12 24
1973 in science
1973 12 24
December 1973 events